HMS Wishart (D67) was a Modified W-class destroyer of the British Royal Navy that saw service in World War II. She spent most of her wartime career based at Gibraltar, engaged in convoy defence, but also served in various naval and military operations in the Mediterranean Sea.

Construction and commissioning

Wishart, the first Royal Navy ship of the name, was ordered in January 1918 as part of the 13th Order of the 1918–1919 Naval Programme, and was laid down on 18 May  1918 by John I. Thornycroft & Company at Woolston, Hampshire.  The pace of her construction slowed after the Armistice with Germany brought World War I to an end on 11 November 1918, but she was launched on 18 July 1919 and completed in June 1920.

Service history

Interwar

Upon completion, Wishart was commissioned in June 1920.  During the interwar period she served first in the Atlantic Fleet and then in the Mediterranean Fleet, and while in the latter had  Lord Louis Mountbatten as her commanding officer for a time.

Wishart was in waters off China when the United States Navy gunboat  was heavily damaged by fire while at sea on 14 March 1934. Wishart and the merchant ship SS Tsinan took off Fultons crew, three of whom had suffered minor injuries, and took them to the Royal Navy Dockyard at Hong Kong, and Wisharts sister ship  stood by Fulton until a salvage party could put the fire out. The United States Department of the Navy later passed thanks to British naval authorities for the assistance Wishart and Whitshed provided to Fulton and her crew.

World War II

1939–1940

When the United Kingdom entered World War II in September 1939, Wishart was stationed at Gibraltar, tasked with contraband control duties and trade defence in the Mediterranean Sea and North Atlantic Ocean.  On 27 December 1939 she intercepted the German merchant ship Glickburg, and Glickburgs crew ran their ship aground on the coast of Spain near the Chipiona Light at Chipiona. On 29 December 1939, Wishart and the destroyer  departed Gibraltar with Convoy HG 13F, bound for Liverpool, remaining with the convoy as its escort until detaching on 3 January 1940 to return to Gibraltar.

On 1 February 1940, Wishart and the destroyer  escorted Convoy OG 16F on the first leg of its voyage to the United Kingdom.  Wishart also escorted Convoy OG 18 on the first segment of its voyage when it departed Gibraltar on 4 February 1940, detaching to return to Gibraltar on 5 February 1940. On 14 February 1940, she rendezvoused with Convoy HG 19F, escorted by two French Navy destroyers, and escorted it to Gibraltar, where it arrived on 18 February 1940.  On 25 February 1940, Wishart and the sloops  and  departed Gibraltar as the escort of Convoy OG 19F on the first leg of its voyage to Liverpool, detaching on 27 February 1940 and returning to Gibraltar.

From 14 to 17 March 1940, Wishart and the destroyer  joined two French destroyers in escorting Convoy OG 21 on the first leg of its voyage from Gibraltar to Liverpool. From 21 to 24 March 1940, Wishart again joined two French destroyers as escort for Convoy OG 22 during the first segment of its voyage from Gibraltar to Liverpool.

Wishart continued her convoy escort and patrol activities until 31 July 1940, when she became part of the escort for Force H units covering the aircraft carrier  as Argus delivered aircraft to Malta in Operation Hurry. Wishart  then remained with Force H as the aircraft carrier  launched airstrikes against Italian airfields at Cagliari  on Sardinia on 2 August 1940.

She again left her convoy duties on 15 November 1940 to participate in Operation White, escorting Force H forces covering  Argus while she delivered more aircraft to Malta. On 27 November 1940, aircraft sighted heavy units of the Italian battlefleet at sea attempting to intercept the convoy, and the other ships detached to engage the Italians – resulting in the Battle of Cape Spartivento, a brief exchange of gunfire before the Italian fleet returned to base – while Wishart and Vidette remained behind to protect the convoy.

1941

Wishart spent the first quarter of 1941 operating on North Atlantic convoy duty from Gibraltar. In March 1941, the Royal Navy selected her for transfer to local convoy escort duty at Freetown in Sierra Leone. Accordingly, she departed Gibraltar on 2 April 1941 as part of the escort for Convoy WS 7 bound for Freetown, and remained there after the convoy arrived on 4 April. On 7 April 1941, she rejoined WS 7 when it departed Freetown on the next leg of its voyage, forming part of its escort with the destroyers  and  Vidette until detaching from the convoy on 9 April 1940 to return to Freetown.

In June 1941, Wishart returned to Gibraltar to resume her convoy escort duties there. She again was selected for duty with Force H on 26 June 1941 for another Malta aircraft delivery operation, but she quickly was replaced in this duty by the destroyer  and remained on duty at Gibraltar instead.

In July 1941, Wishart returned to the United Kingdom for refit and conversion into a long-range escort, and she was in shipyard hands for the rest of the year.

1942

Upon completing her refit and conversion, Wishart passed her acceptance trials in January 1942 and in February 1942 – the month in which the civil community of Port Talbot, Glamorgan, Wales, "adopted" her as the result of a Warship Week National Savings campaign – proceeded to Gibraltar. In March 1942, she resumed her convoy escort duties there.

On 27 March 1942, she detached from her normal duties again to participate with the same ships in Operation Picket II, another such aircraft delivery.

Wishart, the destroyer , and aircraft of the Royal Air Forces No. 202 Squadron sank the German submarine U-74 with all hands east of Cartagena, Spain, in a depth-charge attack at position  on 2 May 1942. On 8 May 1942, she detached for duty with Force H, joining destroyers of the 13th Destroyer Flotilla in escorting Renown, Charybdis, Eagle, and Wasp as Eagle and Wasp delivered aircraft to Malta in Operation Bowery. Her assignment to Force H continued into June, and she began a deployment in support of Operation Style on 2 June 1942, joining Charybdis, Antelope, Ithuriel, Partridge, and Westcott in covering Eagle as she delivered aircraft to Malta. On 8 June, Wishart began another such operation, Operation Salient, this time participating in a covering force consisting of Cairo, Wrestler, and the ships which had taken part in Operation Style as Eagle again delivered aircraft to Malta.

Wishart returned to convoy escort duties at Gibraltar on 18 June 1942. On 26 June she joined Convoy WS 20 and was detached to escort the merchant ship SS Narkunda into Gibraltar. When the convoy reached the Skerki Banks in the central Mediterranean on 13 August 1942, she and the rest of Force Z detached and returned to Gibraltar, where Wishart resumed routine convoy escort duty.

In November 1942, Wishart was assigned to duty escorting military convoys in the North Atlantic and Mediterranean carrying troops and supplies for Operation Torch, the Allied invasion of French North Africa. On 7 November, she, Velox, and the frigate  joined the escort of an assault convoy bound for North Africa for the invasion and detached to stand by the U.S. Navy attack transport  after an Axis submarine torpedoed Thomas Stone; after the troops had disembarked into landing craft or been taken aboard Spey, Wishart escorted Thomas Stone while a tug towed her to Algiers in Algeria for repairs.

1943–1945

During the first half of 1943, Wishart continued her convoy escort duties at Gibraltar but also supported Allied military operations ashore in North Africa.  In July 1943, she was assigned to support Operation Husky, the Allied invasion of Sicily, and was present during the amphibious landings southwest of Syracuse on 10 July 1943, the first day of the invasion. For the rest of 1943, she was deployed for convoy defence in the western and central Mediterranean.

In January 1944, Wishart was deployed for convoy escort duty at Gibraltar. On 24 February 1944, after a U.S. Navy PBY Catalina aircraft of Patrol Squadron 63 using magnetic anomaly detection equipment detected the German submarine U-761 near Tangier while U-761 was attempting to transit the Strait of Gibraltar, a U.S. Navy PV Ventura aircraft of Bombing Squadron 127 and a British Catalina of the Royal Air Forces No. 202 Squadron attacked the submarine and forced her to surface. Wishart and Anthony then approached U-761, and the submarine scuttled herself within sight of the destroyers, suffering nine dead. Wishart and Anthony captured her 48 survivors.

Wishart remained on convoy defence duty at Gibraltar until January 1945, when the Royal Navy decided to withdraw her from service and she steamed to the United Kingdom for deactivation.

Decommissioning and disposal

Wishart was decommissioned in February 1945. On 20 March 1945, she was sold for scrapping by Thos. W. Ward at Inverkeithing, Scotland. The ship arrived at the shipbreakers yard under tow sometime after the armistice with Japan brought World War II to a close on 15 August 1945.

Notes

Bibliography

External links
 HMS WISHART (D 67) –  V & W-class Destroyer
 uboat.net HMS Wishart (D 67)

 

V and W-class destroyers of the Royal Navy
Ships built in Southampton
1919 ships
World War II destroyers of the United Kingdom
Gibraltar in World War II